Horatius Acquaviva d'Aragona (died 13 June 1617) was a Roman Catholic prelate who served as Bishop of Caiazzo (1592–1617).

Biography
Horatius Acquaviva d'Aragona was ordained a priest in the Cistercian Order. On 19 June 1592, he was appointed during the papacy of Pope Clement VIII as Bishop of Caiazzo. He served as Bishop of Caiazzo until his death on 13 June 1617.

References

External links and additional sources
 (for Chronology of Bishops) 
 (for Chronology of Bishops)  

16th-century Italian Roman Catholic bishops
Bishops appointed by Pope Clement VIII
1617 deaths
Cistercian bishops
17th-century Italian Roman Catholic bishops